Thrap is a surname. Notable people with the surname include:

Daniel Thrap (1832–1913), Norwegian priest, historian, and author
Jørgen Berner Thrap (1898–1990), Norwegian judge
Niels Andreas Thrap (1793–1856), Norwegian civil servant and politician

Norwegian-language surnames